Andrei Aleksandrovich Smyshlyayev (born 29 May 1983) is a former Russian professional football player.

Club career
He played 3 seasons in the Russian Football National League for FC Lokomotiv Chita.

External links
 
 

1983 births
Living people
Russian footballers
Association football midfielders
FC Chita players